Tagapul-an, officially the Municipality of Tagapul-an, is a 5th class municipality in the province of Samar, Philippines. According to the 2020 census, it has a population of 8,805 people.

It is the farthest municipality from the province's mainland.

Geography

Barangays
Tagapul-an is politically subdivided into 14 barangays.
 Baquiw
 Balocawe
 Guinbarucan
 Labangbaybay
 Luna
 Mataluto
 Nipa
 Pantalan
 Pulangbato
 San Vicente
 Sugod (Poblacion)
 Suarez (Manlangit)
 San Jose (Poblacion)
 Trinidad

Climate

Demographics

Economy

Transportation
The only one means of access to Tagapul-an is by motorboat from the port of Calbayog, taking usually up to 2 hours of travel.

References

External links
 Tagapul-an Profile at PhilAtlas.com
 [ Philippine Standard Geographic Code]
 Philippine Census Information
 Local Governance Performance Management System

Municipalities of Samar (province)
Island municipalities in the Philippines